Eastern Command was a Command of the British Army.

Nineteenth century

Great Britain was divided into military districts on the outbreak of war with France in 1793. In the first half of the 19th century the command included the counties of Essex, Suffolk, Norfolk, Cambridgeshire, Huntingdonshire and Hertfordshire. It was based in Colchester.

Disbanded after the Napoleonic Wars, the Eastern District Command was re-created in 1866 and was based at Flagstaff House in Colchester. In January 1876 a ‘Mobilization Scheme for the forces in Great Britain and Ireland’ was published, with the ‘Active Army’ divided into eight army corps based on the District Commands. 1st Corps was to be formed within Eastern Command, based in Colchester. This scheme disappeared in 1881, when the districts were retitled ‘District Commands’.

Twentieth century
The 1901 Army Estimates introduced by St John Brodrick allowed for six army corps based on six regional commands. As outlined in a paper published in 1903, IV Corps was to be formed in a reconstituted Eastern Command, with HQ at London. Lieutenant General Lord Grenfell was appointed acting General Officer Commanding-in-Chief (GOCinC) of IV Corps in April 1903.

First World War

Army Order No 324, issued on 21 August 1914, authorised the formation of a 'New Army' of six Divisions, manned by volunteers who had responded to Earl Kitchener's appeal (hence the First New Army was known as 'K1'). Each division was to be under the administration of one of the Home Commands, and Eastern Command formed what became the 12th (Eastern) Division. It was followed by 18th (Eastern) Division of K2 in September 1914. During the First World War, HQ Eastern Command was in London: initially at Horse Guards, then (from February 1916) at 50 Pall Mall, London; in 1919 it moved to 41 Queen's Gardens, Bayswater.

Second World War

At the outbreak of the Second World War, the headquarters was again located at Horse Guards, but by October 1939 it had moved to Hounslow Barracks. At that time Regular Troops reporting to the Command included 4th Infantry Division. In 1941, the Command relocated to Luton Hoo in Bedfordshire. During the war, the 76th Infantry (Reserve) Division was assigned to the command as its training formation.

Post War

After the War the command moved back to Hounslow Barracks in Hounslow. When the Territorial Army was reformed in 1947, 54th (East Anglian) was not reconstituted as a field division, but 161st Infantry Brigade was reformed as an independent infantry brigade in Eastern Command. From 1947 to 1956 101 Coast Brigade supervised RA TA coastal defence regiments, until the disestablishment of all coastal artillery. 

In 1952 the Command was reported to include 48 Field Regiment RA, Kirkee Barracks, Colchester; 49 Field Regiment RA, Canterbury; 47 Coast Regiment RA, Dover; 36 Army Engineer Regiment, Maidstone; and 1st Battalion, The Devonshire Regiment, at Colchester. 

In 1954 a single-storey blockhouse was built at Wilton Park in Beaconsfield, to provide a protected Eastern Command headquarters for use in the event of war; however in 1957 this provision was superseded by plans for Regional Seats of Government. In 1968, Eastern Command was dissolved and merged into a reconfigured Southern Command. The new HQ Southern Command was established at Hounslow, and the last GOCinC Eastern Command took over as GOCinC Southern Command. In 1972, Southern Command, together with the other two geographic commands, was merged with Army Strategic Command to form a new command: UK Land Forces (UKLF).

Command Training Centres 
Between 1941 and 1943, each regional command of the British Army formed at-least one training centre which trained those recruits preparing to move overseas.  The centres which were based within the command were:

 Essex Infantry Training Centre, Warley Barracks, became No.1 Training Centre on 14 August 1941 — affiliated with the City of London Regiment (Royal Fusiliers) and Essex Regiment
 From 2 July 1941 included No.51 Physical Training Wing
 Norfolk Infantry Training Centre, Britannia Barracks, became No.2 Training Centre on 14 August 1941 — affiliated with the Royal Norfolk Regiment and Northamptonshire Regiment
 From 2 July 1941 included No.52 Physical Training Wing
 Suffolk Infantry Training Centre, Gibraltar Barracks, became No.3 Training Centre on 14 August 1941 — affiliated with the Suffolk Regiment and Bedfordshire and Hertfordshire Regiment
 From 2 July 1941 included No.53 Physical Training Wing

General Officers Commanding-in-Chief
GOCs and GOCinCs have included:General Officer Commanding Eastern District
1795 – 1800 General Sir William Howe
1801 – 1802 General the Marquess Cornwallis
1802 – 1805 Major General Sir James Craig 
1805 – 1806 Major General Sir James Pulteney
1806 – 1814 Lieutenant General Lord Chatham
1815 – 1819 Major General Sir John Byng

1866 – 1869 Major General Thomas Tidy
1869 – 1870 Major General Richard Farren
1870 – 1872 Lieutenant General Freeman Murray
1872 Lieutenant General the Hon. Alexander Hamilton-Gordon
1872 – 1877 Major General Sir Edward Greathed
1877 – 1878 Lieutenant General Sir Richard Kelly
1878 – 1882 Lieutenant General William Pollexfen Radcliffe
1882 Major General the Hon. Sir Henry Clifford 
1882 – 1886 Lieutenant General Robert White
1886 – 1889 Major General Sir Evelyn Wood
1889 – 1892 Major General Henry Buchanan
1892 – 1896 Lieutenant General John Glyn
1896 – 1898 Major General Charles Burnett
1898 – 1899 Major General Sir William Gatacre
1899 – 1900 Major General Henry Abadie
1900 – 1903 Major General Sir William Gatacre (also commander 10th Division and 19th Brigade from 1 April 1903)
1903 – 1904 Major General Herbert Plumer
1904 – 1905 Major General Arthur Wynne
10th Division was renamed 6th Division in 1905.

Commander 4th Army Corps

Home District at Horse Guards, Eastern District at Colchester, Thames District at Chatham and Woolwich District were grouped under 4th Army Corps in 1903.
 1 April 1903: General the Lord Grenfell
 6 June 1904: General the Lord Methuen
4th Army Corps was renamed Eastern Command 1 June 1905.

General Officer Commanding Eastern Command
1905 – 1908 Lieutenant General Lord Methuen
1908 – 1912 Lieutenant General Sir Arthur Paget
1912 – 1914 Lieutenant General Sir James Grierson
1914 – 1915 Lieutenant General Sir Charles Woollcombe
1915 – 1916 Lieutenant General Sir Leslie Rundle
1916 – 1917 Lieutenant General Sir James Wolfe Murray
1917 – 1918 Lieutenant General Sir Henry Wilson
1918 General Sir William Robertson
1918 – 1919 Lieutenant General Sir Charles Woollcombe
1919 – 1923 General Lord Horne
1923 – 1926 Lieutenant General Sir George Milne
1926 – 1927 Lieutenant General Sir Walter Braithwaite
1927 – 1931 General Sir Robert Whigham
1931 – 1933 General Sir Webb Gillman
1933 – 1936 Lieutenant General Sir Cyril Deverell
1936 – 1938 Lieutenant General Sir Edmund Ironside
1938 – 1941 Lieutenant General Sir Guy Williams
1941 – 1942 Lieutenant General Laurence Carr
April 1942 – August 1942 Lieutenant General Sir Kenneth Anderson
September 1942 – January 1944 Lieutenant General Sir James Gammell
January 1944 – December 1944 Lieutenant General Sir Kenneth Anderson
December 1944 – August 1945 Lieutenant General Sir Alan Cunningham
1945 – 1947 Lieutenant General Sir Oliver Leese
1947 – 1950 General Sir Evelyn Barker
1950 – 1952 General Sir Gerald Templer
1952 – 1953 Lieutenant General Sir George Erskine
1953 – 1954 Lieutenant General Sir Geoffrey Bourne
1954 – 1956 Lieutenant General Sir Francis Festing
1956 – 1959 Lieutenant General Sir Charles Coleman
1959 – 1960 Lieutenant General Sir James Cassels
1960 – 1961 General Sir Gerald Lathbury
1962 – 1965 Lieutenant General Sir Roderick McLeod
1965 – 1966 Lieutenant General Sir George Cole
1966 – 1968 Lieutenant General Sir David Peel Yates

References

Sources

 
 
 

Commands of the British Army
Military units and formations disestablished in 1972